Mayer International Auction Records aka Guide Mayer is listing international art auctions results as a dictionary for both fine art amateurs and collectors as well as art market professionals like galleries and auctioneers. 800 auction houses from 40 countries contributed information to the publication. The dictionary was first published in 1962 by Enrique Mayer up until 1982 when Enrique Mayer sold the publication to the Migros Group in Switzerland. In 1986 Migros sold the Mayer dictionary to Acatos Editions in Lausanne, which published the book until 2001. In 1993 Editions Acatos sold an electronic publishing licence to Digital Media Resources Ltd. from London for the duration of 10 years. The Mayer International Auction Records database was first published on CD-ROM by Digital Media Resources in 1994 and the database was first published online on the internet in 1996 on artlibrary.com. In 1997 David Dehaeck purchased the name and the totality of the publishing rights from Silvio Acatos, publisher and principal owner of Edition Acatos. In 2000 David Dehaeck sold the title and the publishing rights to iCollector.com from London that soon after became part of LiveAuction Group from Canada.

Guide Mayer quotations
Listing by artists as a dictionary, the book was split into categories such as

 Paintings
 Sculptures
 Drawings
 Prints
 Watercolours
 Photographs

References

External links
 Free Art Price Database Goes Online
 The Getty Appraisals Research Guide 
 New York Public Library 
 Rutgers Lirary
 University Libraries
 Metropolitan Museum of Art Museum
 Victoria & Albert Museum Library 

Consumer guides